The 1999–2000 international cricket season was from September 1999 to April 2000.

Season overview

September

1999-2000 LG Cup

October

West Indies in Bangladesh

New Zealand in India

1999-2000 Coca-Cola Champions Trophy

Australia in Zimbabwe

Zimbabwe in South Africa

November

Pakistan in Australia

South Africa in Zimbabwe

Sri Lanka in Zimbabwe

England in South Africa

December

India in Australia

West Indies in New Zealand

January

1999–2000 Carlton and United Series

2000 Standard Bank International One-Day Series

February

Sri Lanka in Pakistan

England in Zimbabwe

Australia in New Zealand

South Africa in India

March

Zimbabwe in the West Indies

1999-2000 Coca-Cola Cup

April

Australia in South Africa

References

 
1999 in cricket
2000 in cricket